Littleton is a Census Designated Place in Clay County, Kentucky, United States. Littleton is located on the northern border of Manchester.

References

Unincorporated communities in Clay County, Kentucky
Unincorporated communities in Kentucky